William Greig may refer to:
William Greig (politician) (1840–1918), farmer, lumber merchant and political figure in Quebec
William Greig (songwriter), Newcastle songwriter
W. D. O. Greig (William Dallas Ochterlony Greig), English footballer
William Greig, Scottish prisoner of war during WWII who escaped and played a role in the Battle for Czech Radio

See also
James Greig (British politician) (James William Greig, 1859–1934), British barrister and politician
William Greg, essayist
William Gregg (disambiguation)